Air Vice Marshal Ranjan Dutt, VrC (30 September 1921 or 1922 - 13 August 2009) was a former air officer of the Indian Air Force. He last served as the Air Officer Commanding-in-Chief Eastern Air Command. Prior to that, he was the managing director of Hindustan Aeronautics Limited.

In 1940 Dutt was one of the 24 Indian pilots seconded to the UK for operational training and squadron service. There he was selected for fighter training and subsequently spent the summer of 1941 protecting convoys through the English Channel and flying Hurricanes with No. 32 Squadron RAF after the Battle of Britain. He served in North Africa and the Middle-East in the latter part of that year before returning to India to join No. 4 Squadron IAF at Peshawar, North-West frontier. There, he flew sorties from Miranshah in the Datakhel operations. In June 1944 he became one of the first Indian flight instructors at a training unit in Risalpur. The following year he completed a flight leader course at RAF Tangmere in the UK, and then joined No. 8 Squadron IAF in Mingaladon, as flight commander. 

Later, in a senior post at the Operational group, he led several air missions in the Indo-Pakistani War of 1947–1948. On 26 January 1950 he was awarded the first Vir Chakra.

Early life and education
Ranjan Dutt was born on 30 September 1921, or in 1922. He was educated at Prince of Wales Royal Indian Military College, Dehradun in India. At the age of 16 years he gained his civilian pilot "A" licence after receiving private lessons.

Military career

Second World War

In August 1940, Dutt was selected from the 4th pilot's course at the initial training wing in Lahore to travel with another 23 Indian pilots to the UK for operational training and squadron service in preparation to assist in the Battle of Britain. They became known as the X-squad. The youngest of the batch, he later admitted that he submitted an incorrect date of birth in order to qualify for the place. The group's activities received widespread media coverage. The P&O liner SS Strathallan's passenger list records the group's arrival at Liverpool, England, on 6 October 1940. On arrival at London on 8 October, Dutt and his group were welcomed by the Air Minister, Sir Archibald Sinclair, who handed each a note concluding "we shall be proud to have you fighting by our side". That day the group were posted to RAF Uxbridge, and subsequently Dutt was sent with most of the others to No. 12 Elementary Flying Training School RAF at Prestwick to train on Tiger Moths. He completed his advanced training at No. 9 Service Flying Training School at RAF Hullavington, Wiltshire, and received his wings on 16 April 1941. Eight of the Indians, including Dutt, were selected for fighter training at No. 56 OTU at RAF Sutton Bridge. Subsequently, he spent near four months protecting convoys through the English Channel and flying Hurricanes with No. 32 Squadron RAF after the Battle of Britain.

After a year in the UK he was posted to No. 94 Squadron RAF, based in Egypt. Along with Mahinder Singh Pujji, Mian Mohd Latif and Edwin Nazirullah from his initial group, he served in North Africa and the Middle-East in the latter part of 1941. After returning to India he joined No. 4 Squadron IAF at Peshawar, North-West frontier. No.4 Squadron was officially formed on 1 February 1942 and at first consisted largely of some of that first batch of 24 Indian pilots of 1940; Pujji, Latif, Nazirullah, Shiv Dev Singh, and Om Prakash Sanghi. They obtained four Westland Lysanders from Lahore and completed a move to Kohat by 23 February 1942. By March 1942, the squadron had 19 officers and 40 pilots. In May 1942, Dutt flew several sorties from Miranshah in the Datakhel operations; these lasted until mid-August. At the end of 1942 he was posted as flight officer to No. 1 Squadron IAF, also known as the Tigers, at Trichinopoly. 

In June 1944, he became one of the first Indian flight instructors at No. 151 (Fighter) Operational Training Unit RAF, Risalpur. He served in the Burma campaign, flying Hurricanes. For a short while he was posted to No. 20 Squadron RAF Arakan and saw action in Battle of Imphal. He later joined the newly raised No. 10 Squadron IAF in 1944 and replaced Bob Doe's Canadian pilot. Dutt remained there for the squadron's first operational tours. In August 1945, after completing a flight leader course at RAF Tangmere in the UK, Dutt joined No. 8 Squadron IAF in Mingaladon, as flight commander. There, he substituted the Vic formation with the finger-four formation. In March 1946, Dutt was promoted to squadron leader of No. 1 Squadron RIAF. Towards the beginning of 1947, under Dutt's command, the Tigers converted to the Hawker Tempest.

Post-Independence
In August 1947, with the partition of India, Dutt moved to India. In November that year, he was appointed Senior Air Staff Officer (SASO) of the No. 1 Operational group at Palam, he led several air missions in the Indo-Pakistani War of 1947–1948, including a strike sortie on Kishanganga Bridge. On 1 August 1948, he was promoted to the acting rank of Group Captain and continued in the same appointment of SASO, No. 1 Operational Group.

Vir Chakra
On 26 January 1950, with India becoming a republic, the first gallantry awards were announced. Dutt was awarded the Vir Chakra for gallantry for his role in the Indo-Pakistani War of 1947, with the effective date of award of 2 November 1948.

The citation for the Vir Chakra reads as follows:

Later career
On 1 July 1951, Dutt was appointed Commanding Officer of the No. 1 Air Force Academy (No. 1 AFA) in Ambala. In September that year, he led the movement of the Academy to Secunderabad. He graduated in 1952 from RAF Staff College, Andover, with a thesis on “Commonwealth Defence”. On 1 April 1953, he was made substantive group captain.  In 1957, he contributed to the evaluation for the purchase of Hawker Hunters for the IAF. In October 1954, he moved to Air HQ having been appointed Director, Operations.

Air rank
After a four-year tenure, on 28 May 1958, he was promoted to the acting rank of Air Commodore and appointed Air Officer-in-charge Policy and Plans at Air HQ. This was a short tenure - in March next year, he took over as the Air officer commanding Training Command at Bangalore. In April 1960, the post was upgraded to a two-star rank and rechristened Air Officer Commanding-in-Chief. Dutt was promoted to the acting rank of Air Vice Marshal. He was just 37, probably the youngest in the world to hold the rank of Air Vice Marshal. By the end of the year, Dutt was appointed the managing director of Hindustan Aeronautics Limited (HAL). At HAL, he led the procurement of HAL HF-24 Maruts designed by Kurt Tank, and later MiG-21s. 

After a long six-year stint as the MD of HAL, in October 1966, Dutt was appointed Air Officer Commanding-in-Chief Eastern Air Command]] at Shillong. He served as the AOC-in-C for two years. At the completion of tenure in Air Rank, he retired on 31 May 1968.

Personal life
Dutt married Claude Marie De Cavey from Belgium. Their daughter is Ayesha Dutt, who is married to Jackie Shroff, and his grandson is Tiger Shroff.

Awards and decorations
Dutt had served North Africa and the Middle-East for long enough to wear the Africa Star. Later, he qualified for the Air Crew Europe Star. On 26 January 1950 he was awarded the first Vir Chakra.

Death
He died on 13 August 2009 in Chennai.

Footnotes

References

Bibliography

Further reading

External links
 (British Pathé)
 (British Pathé)

1921 births
2009 deaths
Indian aviators
Indian Air Force officers
Recipients of the Vir Chakra
Indian military personnel of World War II
20th-century Indian military personnel